Pujŏnhoban station is a railway station in Pujŏn'gowŏn, Hobal-lodongjagu, Pujŏn County, South Hamgyŏng province, North Korea. It is the terminus of the (narrow gauge) Sinhŭng Line of the Korean State Railway.

History 
The station was opened on 10 September 1932 by the Sinhŭng Railway as part of the  second section of its Songhŭng Line between Hamnam Songhŭng and here. The Sinhŭng Railway was bought and absorbed by the Chosen Railway on 22 April 1938.

References

Railway stations in North Korea